The 1917 William & Mary Indians football team represented the College of William & Mary as a member of the Eastern Virginia Intercollegiate Athletic Association (EVIAA) and the South Atlantic Intercollegiate Athletic Association (SAIAA) during the 1917 college football season. Led by Harry Young in his first and only year as head coach, William & Mary finished the season 3–5 overall, 2–4 in EVIAA play, and 0–3 against SAIAA opponents.

Schedule

References

William and Mary
William and Mary
William & Mary Tribe football seasons
William and Mary Indians football